Region Plaza Joetsu is the multi-purpose facilities in Jōetsu, Niigata, Japan.

References

External links
 

Basketball venues in Japan
Indoor arenas in Japan
Niigata Albirex BB
Sports venues in Niigata Prefecture
Jōetsu, Niigata
Sports venues completed in 1984
1984 establishments in Japan